Samantha Elizabeth Brown (born March 31, 1970) is an American television host, notable for her work as the host of several Travel Channel shows including Girl Meets Hawaii, Great Vacation Homes, Great Hotels, Passport to Europe, Passport to Latin America, Great Weekends, Green Getaways, Passport to China, and Samantha Brown's Asia. As of  2012 Samantha Brown has made her own travel luggage called Samantha Brown: Travel America. She has visited 62 countries. In January 2018, she began hosting Samantha Brown's Places to Love on PBS. It is shown on PBS stations nationwide and is on the PBS website and app.

She is currently a resident of Brooklyn, New York.

Early life
Brown was born in Dallas, Texas, in 1970, but her family soon moved to New Castle, New Hampshire, where she grew up and graduated from Pinkerton Academy in Derry, New Hampshire. She performed with Music and Drama Company with award-winning designer Brian Sidney Bembridge; took 12 years of voice lessons; attended Chapman University, and transferred to Syracuse University to study musical theater. As stated in one of her episodes in Passport to Europe, she is of Scottish and German descent.

Commercials
Brown's early career included working in commercials, notably playing the spokesperson "Wendy Wire" for a company called Century Cable. She
appeared in the HP Pavilion "Computer is Personal Again" commercials. Additionally, she is the spokesperson for ECCO shoes.  and was also a spokesperson in a 2009 commercial for Cedar Point amusement park. She is involved in the comedy sketch group "Mouth", based in New York, where she has lived for over 12 years.

Travel Channel
In 1999 and 2000, the Travel Channel was looking for a travel host, and Brown was chosen after a series of auditions. In her role of host, she introduces viewers to vacation destinations and hotels in the United States and around the world, as well as showcasing restaurants and activities at those destinations. As a travel host, Brown travels 230 days out of the year and takes eight days to film an hour-long episode.

Since joining the network, Brown has hosted several series including Girl Meets Hawaii, Great Vacation Homes, Great Hotels, Passport to Europe, Passport to Great Weekends, and Passport to Latin America.

In addition to her regular shows, Brown hosted several Travel Channel specials, such as the 2006 all-access special Great Cruises: Freedom of the Seas with Samantha Brown aboard the Freedom of the Seas cruise ship, the largest passenger ship in the world at the time of its launch. Prior to that, she hosted a 12-night Mediterranean Venice cruise aboard the Brilliance of the Seas cruise ship. The accompanying show was titled Samantha Brown's First Cruise. In 2007, she hosted a special titled Passport to Green Getaways, a travelogue to three eco-friendly destinations in North America.

In 2007, Brown had two shows in production. In April 2007, Discovery Networks announced that she would host a new series titled Passport to Great Weekends ... With Samantha Brown featuring Brown exploring 48-hour vacation locations in the US and abroad. In September 2007, she was in Beijing, filming Passport to China, which aired in July 2008, just ahead of the Beijing Olympics.

In 2008, Brown debuted Passport to Great Weekends, which showcased her in a more informal light as well as following her on more unique, off-the-beaten-path vacations. Episodes would follow the format of her arrival at a destination on a Friday afternoon and conclude with her leaving on Sunday evening. The second season's title was changed to Samantha Brown's Great Weekends and featured a new introduction, but mostly the same format.

On February 8, 2010, the Travel Channel presented Samantha Brown's 10th Anniversary Special to commemorate Brown's ten years as host.

On April 9, 2010, she made a special guest appearance on The Price Is Right to present a travel-themed showcase.

On July 12, 2010, Samantha Brown's Asia was released on the Travel Channel.

In Anthony Bourdain's "Christmas Special" episode of No Reservations, first aired in the U.S. on December 12, 2011, Samantha Brown appeared in a segment that satirized both her persona and the supposed conflict between the "perky" Brown and the "edgy" Bourdain. In the same month, more in keeping with her wholesome "girl next door" image, Brown hosted a video tour of the new Disney resort in Hawaii, which was produced and released by Disney to promote the Disney Vacation Club.In the summer of 2013, Samantha shot a new pilot for the Travel Channel in the Yellowstone area but Brown tweeted at the time that she could not talk about it for fear of jinxing the project. The project later proved to be two sample episodes of Samantha Brown's Cash Attack, a travel-related game show. 

Brown ambushed tourists in popular travel destinations and gave them an opportunity to win cash by answering questions related to the area and/or performing travel challenges. The two episodes aired on November 26, 2013.

Brown served as a co-host of The Trip: 2014, a sweepstakes event that took viewers on a trip through Spain and Morocco.

Brown was also a co-host for The Trip: 2015 in Hawaii, which originally aired in February 2015. She was seen in the Travel Channel series 50/50 with co-host Chris Grundy in 2015 and Track Down Samantha Brown.

PBS
In the summer of 2017, Brown left the Travel Channel and later started filming a new series for PBS, Samantha Brown's Places to Love. According to PBS, the series, first airing on January 6, 2018, features Brown seeking out "the little known spots and haunts where innovators and disrupters are creating a brand new travel experience. Whether it's food and drink, art and design, culture or adventure, at the end of each episode viewers will have a well curated list of experiences that focus on not just how to visit a destination but how to belong to it." In March 2019, Samantha Brown's Places to Love received three Daytime Emmy nominations, for Outstanding Travel/Adventure Program, Outstanding Directing in a Lifestyle Program, and Outstanding Host in a Lifestyle Program. On May 3, 2019, Samantha Brown's Places to Love won the Emmy for Outstanding Travel/Adventure Program and Brown won the Emmy for Outstanding Host. On February 11, 2020, Brown announced on Facebook that Samantha Brown's Places to Love was beginning production on Season 4.

Personal life
On 28 October 2006, she married husband, Kevin James O’Leary.
On 17 January 2013, she and husband Kevin O'Leary welcomed twins, a son, Ellis James, and a daughter, Elizabeth Mae, in Brooklyn, N.Y.

References

External links

 Travel Channel :: Samantha Brown
 
 Samantha Brown's Blog

1970 births
Living people
American people of German descent
American people of Scottish descent
People from Dallas
People from Derry, New Hampshire
Chapman University alumni
Syracuse University alumni
American stage actresses
Television personalities from New York City
American women television personalities
People from New Castle, New Hampshire
People from Brooklyn
Pinkerton Academy alumni
21st-century American women